"That's My Pa"  is a 1962 single by Sheb Wooley.  "That's My Pa" would be Sheb Wooley's first single to hit the country chart and was also his most successful release hitting the number one spot for one week and staying on the charts for seventeen weeks.

Chart performance

References

Songs about fathers
1961 singles
Sheb Wooley songs
1961 songs
MGM Records singles
Songs written by Sheb Wooley